Pregassona is a quarter of the city of Lugano, Switzerland. Pregassona was formerly a municipality of its own, having been incorporated into Lugano in 2004.

The name Pregassona comes from a contraction of the local dialect for "near the Cassone"; the Cassone is a small river that flows through the village.

Monuments and places of interest 
 Church of Saint Mary, documented since 1222
 Oratory of Saints Peter & Paul, 14th century
 Church of Saint John the Baptist and Maximilian Kolbe, 1995

References

External links
 
 Official site of the quarter
 Lugano Monte Brè

Former municipalities of Ticino
Districts of Lugano